Concerted metalation-deprotonation (CMD) is a mechanistic pathway through which transition-metal catalyzed C–H activation reactions can take place. In a CMD pathway, the C–H bond of the substrate is cleaved and the new C–Metal bond forms through a single transition state. This process does not go through a metal species that is bound to the cleaved hydrogen atom. Instead, a carboxylate or carbonate base deprotonates the substrate. The first proposal of a concerted metalation deprotonation pathway was by S. Winstein and T. G. Traylor in 1955 for the acetolysis of diphenylmercury. It was found to be the lowest energy transition state in a number of computational studies, was experimentally confirmed through NMR experiments, and has been hypothesized to occur in mechanistic studies.

While there are a number of different possible mechanisms for C–H activation, a CMD pathway is common for high valent, late transition metals like PdII, RhIII, IrIII, and RuII. The C–H bonds that have been found to undergo C–H activation through CMD include those that are aryl, alkyl, and alkenyl. Investigations into CMD paved the way for the development of many new C–H functionalization reactions, especially in the areas of direct arylation and alkylation by palladium and ruthenium.

Mechanism 

CMD begins with a high valent, late transition metal like PdII that may or may not be bound to a carboxylate anion. The computed transition state involves concerted partial formation of a carbon–metal bond and partial protonation of the carboxylate. At the same time, any anionic metal–carboxylate bond begins to break, as does the carbon–hydrogen bond that is being activated. Compared to other possible processes such as oxidative addition of the C–H bond to the metal, CMD is lower in energy in many cases. A transition state in which the carboxylate is bound to the metal can be referred to as either CMD or AMLA, which stands for "ambiphilic metal–ligand assistance," but the latter emphasizes that the carboxylate acts as a ligand during the transition state.

History 
In 1955, S. Winstein and T. G. Traylor published a study of the mechanism of acetolysis of organomercury compounds. They propose a series of possible mechanisms for the process, which they rule out through based on their kinetic data. A concerted metalation deprotonation is considered, and they are unable to rule it out through the data they collect. 

The metalation of organic C–H bonds was extended from mercury to palladium in 1968 by J. M. Davidson and C. Triggs who identified that palladium acetate reacts with benzene in perchloric acid and acetic acid to give biphenyl, palladium(0), and 2 equivalents of acetic acid through an organopalladium intermediate. Early mechanistic studies found that palladium acetate was the best palladium precatalyst due to the presence of the acetate ligand. Mechanistic investigation has been ongoing since these initial discoveries, and infrared spectroscopy on the picosecond–millisecond time scale was used in 2021 to observe the states involved in proton transfer from acetic acid to a metalated ligand, which is the microscopic reverse of a concerted metalation deprotonation process.

Examples 
Reaction systems that are less efficient or entirely inactive in the absence of carboxylate acids and bases are likely to occur through a concerted metalation protonation reaction pathway. An example of such a reaction with an sp3 C–H bond that was reported in 2007 by Keith Fagnou and coworkers is an intramolecular cyclization that uses a palladium catalyst.

A notable example of a reaction that is catalyzed by ruthenium in which directed metalation occurs through CMD was reported by Igor Larossa and coworkers in 2018. The ruthenium catalyst is functional group tolerant and enables the late stage synthesis of pharmaceutically relevant biaryls.

Importance of carboxylate 
Many C–H activation reactions, particularly those involving late transition metals, require carboxylate or carbonate bases. The need for this reaction component often suggests the occurrence of a CMD pathway. However, in order to be classified as CMD, the transition state does not need to involve the carboxylate as a ligand on the metal. Common sources of carboxylate include pivalate, acetate, and benzoate.

References 

Organometallic chemistry
Organic chemistry